Jean-Baptiste-François Bompart (1757 in Lorient – 1842 in Bagnols) was a French privateer, navy officer and admiral. He was related to the noted Admiral Maxime de Bompart.

He took part in the American War of Independence as a young officer.

He later captained the Embuscade. She encountered and fought HMS Boston off New Jersey at the action of 31 July 1793.

Promoted to admiral, he commanded the Expédition d'Irlande and was later defeated at the Battle of Tory Island.

He retired in 1801 over political disputes.

Sources 

 Les Noms qui ont fait l'histoire de Bretagne, Coop Breizh et Institut culturel de Bretagne, 1997, notice de Paul Coat.

French Navy admirals
1757 births
1842 deaths
French military personnel of the American Revolutionary War
French military personnel of the French Revolutionary Wars
French privateers
Military personnel from Lorient